Rebecca Waters (née Duggan; born 10 June 1983) is an English field hockey goalkeeper. She made her senior international debut for the England women's national field hockey team on 19 April 2003 and made one appearance for the Great Britain national women's field hockey team, against South Africa on 10 January 2007.

Duggan was also a footballer and played outfield for several teams in the FA Women's Premier League Southern Division. She joined Charlton Athletic from Fulham in December 2009.

Hockey
Duggan was part of the England squad for 2005 Women's EuroHockey Nations Championship, the 2005 Women's Hockey Champions Challenge and the 2006 Commonwealth Games. She later played in the 2009 Women's EuroHockey Nations Championship semi final defeat to Germany.

In 2006, Duggan appeared in a Push Hockey magazine photoshoot dressed as Uma Thurman's character from Kill Bill.

Football

Duggan began her football career with Chelsea Ladies. She was named Most Improved Player in 2001-02 and won a County Cup in the two following seasons.

She has also featured for AFC Wimbledon, Crystal Palace and Fulham.

References

External links 
England Hockey
Coaching business website
Push Hockey magazine photograph

1983 births
Living people
English female field hockey players
English women's footballers
Sportspeople from Slough
Chelsea F.C. Women players
Fulham L.F.C. players
Charlton Athletic W.F.C. players
Women's association football defenders
Crystal Palace F.C. (Women) players
Field hockey players at the 2006 Commonwealth Games
Commonwealth Games competitors for England